Thomas Glassey (26 February 1844 – 28 September 1936) was an Irish-born Australian politician.

Born in Markethill, County Armagh, he received no formal education, working as a mill-worker and miner in Scotland and England. He migrated to Australia around 1885, when he became a miner at Bundamba, and was Secretary of the Bundamba Miners Association. He was a founding member of the Australian Labor Party in Queensland, and was the first Labor member of any Australian parliament when he was elected to the Legislative Assembly of Queensland in 1888 as the member for Bundamba.

Defeated in 1893, he was subsequently member for Burke from 1894 to 1896 and Bundaberg from 1896 to 1900. He left the Labor Party in 1899 over the party's socialist objective. In 1901, he was elected to the Australian Senate for Queensland, unofficially as a Protectionist (though there was no protectionist organisation in Queensland at the time). In 1903, the National Liberal Union endorsed non-Labor candidates, and Glassey, as a Deakinite, did not receive endorsement. He contested the Senate as an independent protectionist and received 25.6% of the vote, but was not elected.

Glassey died in 1936 and was buried in Toowong Cemetery.

Gallery

Works

References

Australian Labor Party members of the Parliament of Queensland
Protectionist Party members of the Parliament of Australia
Members of the Australian Senate for Queensland
Members of the Australian Senate
1844 births
1936 deaths
Burials at Toowong Cemetery
Leaders of the Opposition in Queensland
Independent members of the Parliament of Australia
20th-century Australian politicians